"Love Affairs" is a song recorded by American country music artist Michael Martin Murphey. It was co-written by Murphey and Mike d'Abo.  It was released in March 1983 as the forth and final single from the album Michael Martin Murphey.  The song peaked at number 11 on the U.S. Billboard Hot Country Singles and at number 18 on the Canadian RPM Country Tracks chart.

The backing vocals are performed by Jennifer Warnes.

Chart performance

References

1983 singles
Michael Martin Murphey songs
Songs written by Mike d'Abo
Songs written by Michael Martin Murphey
Liberty Records singles
1982 songs